SS Godafoss was an Icelandic cargo ship that was torpedoed by the  just off Reykjanes  northwest of Gardur, Iceland, while she was travelling from New York, United States to Reykjavik, Iceland.

Construction 
Godafoss was constructed in 1921 at the Frederikshavns Vaerft & Flydedok A/S shipyard in Frederikshavn, Denmark. Godafoss served in the Eimskipafelagid fleet from July 1921 until her demise in November 1944.
She had a Compound expansion engine driving a single screw propeller and the engine was rated at 124 nhp.

Sinking 
On 10 November 1944, Godafoss was on a voyage in Convoy UR 142 from New York, United States to Reykjavík, Iceland with a general cargo of 1,240 tons. The convoy in which Godafoss was the lead ship had broken up during the night due to foul weather. The vessel sank within seven minutes; 14 crew members, one convoy signalman and ten passengers were lost.

Wreck 

References

Cargo ships
1921 ships
Ships built in Denmark
Ships sunk by German submarines in World War II
Maritime incidents in November 1944
Shipwrecks of Iceland
Ships of Iceland